Mensa Select is an annual award given by American Mensa since 1990 to five board games that are "original, challenging and well designed". The awards are presented at the annual Mensa Mind Games competition.

Past winners

References

External links
List of recipients at Mensa Mind Games

 
Board game awards